Iain James Farquharson, more commonly known as Iain James or Sparx, is a British singer, songwriter and vocal producer from Bristol, but based in London. He started as part of the British boyband Triple 8 in 2003 as their lead singer and known as Sparx. He left after the band had two Top 10 hits and was replaced by Stewart Macintosh in 2005.

He has written a number of songs recorded by a great number of singing artists, plus writing many songs for reality television contestants from UK, Europe and Asia, and on three occasions for Eurovision Song Contest songs, including co-writing the winning song for Azerbaijan "Running Scared" by Ell & Nikki in 2011.

Triple 8
He was the lead singer of UK boy band Triple 8 (888) signed to Polydor records. He was known by his nickname "Sparx".  The group had two successful singles: "Knockout" and "Give Me A Reason", which charted at numbers 8 and 9 respectively in the UK Singles Chart. The group parted company with their record label in 2004, leaving their album, Heavy W8, unreleased. Iain James Farquharson left in 2004, to be replaced as lead singer in 2005 by a new member Stewart Macintosh. before breaking up by the end of 2005.

Writing and production
After Triple 8, he concentrated on music writing and production. He has written for artists as diverse as Westlife, Professor Green, Emeli Sandé, Craig David, Taio Cruz, The Vamps, Anne-Marie, and Korean boyband TVXQ (aka Tohoshinki). He has also written for successful acts from reality television competitions, including Little Mix, One Direction, Olly Murs and Leona Lewis.

He co-wrote British number one "Read All About It" by Professor Green featuring Emeli Sandé, as well as Sandé's own version of the song which appears on her two million selling album Our Version of Events, which broke a record set by the Beatles for longest unimpeded spell in the UK top 10.

Very notably, he wrote several songs on the album of Little Mix, the first ever British girlgroup whose album went straight into the top 5 in the US, including the UK Number 1 "Wings" and the critically lauded third place song "DNA".He wrote songs on their second album Salute, which did not match DNA commercially, but was a critical success, and followed its predecessor in charting in the UK top 5 and US top 10 (it would have repeated DNA's fourth placing if compilations were not included in the US albums chart). He wrote the album's song Little Me with Little Mix and TMS. For the group's third album Get Weird; Iain co-wrote the singles "Love Me Like You" and "Hair" feat. Sean Paul. The group's most successful album Glory Days features the single "Shout Out To My Ex", also co-written by James.

He is also a vocal producer and has recorded many artists including Little Mix, Ella Henderson, One Direction and Pixie Lott.

Eurovision
James co-wrote the Eurovision Song Contest 2011 winning song "Running Scared" by Ell & Nikki, who were the first male-female duo to win the song contest since 1963. They were also the first Azeris to win the contest, winning in Düsseldorf in May 2011.

James also co-wrote the Belgian entry at the Eurovision Song Contest 2013, "Love Kills" by Roberto Bellarosa, which placed 12th, and the British entry at the Eurovision Song Contest 2020, "My Last Breath" by James Newman.

Personal life
He is married to Kelli Young, formerly of pop group Liberty X.

Discography

With Triple 8

References

External links
Discogs.com Iain James Farquharson page

Year of birth missing (living people)
English pop singers
Living people
English songwriters
Place of birth missing (living people)
Eurovision Song Contest winners
Singers from London
Musicians from Bristol
English people of Scottish descent